The Secret at Shadow Ranch is the fifth volume in the Nancy Drew Mystery Stories series. It was first published in 1931 under the pseudonym Carolyn Keene, and was ghostwritten by Mildred Wirt Benson. This book, as of 2001, ranks 50 on the list of All-Time Bestselling Children's Books, according to Publishers Weekly, with 2,347,750 sales since 1931.

Plot summary - 1931 edition
In this book,  you are introduced to Nancy's best friends, Elizabeth "Bess" Marvin and George Fayne, complete opposites. George is a brave, sporty tomboy, while Bess is a girly, shopping, scaredycat. One of Bess and George's cousins, Alice Regor, traveled with Nancy to their Aunt and Uncle's ranch in Arizona where the cousins' aunt attempts to keep up a ranch she received as payment of a debt. Nancy reunites Alice with her long-lost artist father, who is suffering from amnesia. She also uncovers the mystery behind why an old mountain woman is guardian of a beautiful young girl, all the while enjoying mountain life, including horseback riding, a flash flood, being lost in the mountains overnight, and a dangerous mountain lion.

1965 revision
Nancy travels with her friends Bess and George to Shadow Ranch, near Phoenix, Arizona.  The ranch is in danger of being shut down, and is threatened by a phantom horse that seems to bring destruction with it each time it appears. The girls soon become friends with the young ranch hands who help them. The discovery of a pocket watch with a hidden message about a green bottle and a pastel painting are her clues to find the lost treasure of Dirk Valentine. These clues lead her to an ancient Indian dwelling, a prisoner, a chest of gold hearts, a gang of thieves, and a lot of danger. The revised book had the title changed to "of" instead of "at," and doesn't expand the biographies of the cousins significantly. Whereas the ranch is depicted as somewhat slow, and a young doctor is interested in Nancy, the revision sees them involved in resort-town activities with men near their age.

Artwork
Russell H. Tandy illustrated the original dust jacket and internal illustrations, and the frontispiece.  In 1950, Bill Gillies revised the cover art, which featured Nancy on a rearing horse.  The art was revised for the new story in 1965, this time by Rudy Nappi, and featuring the phantom horse.

Continuity Error 
Though Ned Nickerson is mentioned in passing in this book as being in Europe, Nancy doesn't actually meet Ned until two books later, The Clue in the Diary, #7. The mistake was made when this title was revised. In the revised text, Nancy is said to be knitting a sweater for Ned, identified as her boyfriend, in the first chapter. George references the sweater and Ned again in the final chapter. Since Nancy has not yet met Ned in the series, this error was corrected in subsequent printings in the first chapter substituting Ned with her father, Carson Drew. The last chapter still mentioned Ned as the one who would receive the sweater. Many printings later, George's remark in the last chapter was changed from "Ned" to "your dad" when she mentions the sweater Nancy is knitting. However, Ned is still mentioned in this book as being in Europe (page 111), but the reader isn't given any explanation about who Ned actually is since the opening and closing chapters no longer mention his name.

Adaptation 
The tenth installment in the Nancy Drew point-and-click adventure game series by Her Interactive, named Nancy Drew: The Secret of Shadow Ranch, is based on the novel.

A mobile version for iPad, iPhone, and iPod Touch was also released under the Mobile Mysteries label. 

Nancy Drew books
1931 American novels
1931 children's books
1965 American novels
1965 children's books
Novels set in Arizona
Grosset & Dunlap books
Children's mystery novels
Novels adapted into video games